Roeland Wiesnekker (pron. 'Roo-Land') (b. 25 November 1967 near Zürich) is a Dutch / Swiss actor in movies and theater plays.

Life 
Wiesnekker grew up in a music-loving family and tried out various instruments. Despite that, he wanted to become an actor, because he adored Charlie Chaplin. At the age of 15 Wiesnekker started a cook apprenticeship, but did not agree with the “hierarchic structures”. At the age of 16 he planned to become a sports teacher, but soon took up work in a hospital instead. Later he decided to become an actor.

Even before he received the diploma, he was engaged by the theatre Schauspielhaus Bochum, Germany. In 1990 he was nominated for the award  (German talented young actor of the year). Wiesnekker went back to Zürich – despite offers of possible roles abroad. In Zürich he participated in very different productions e.g. in Der Menschenfeind at the Schauspielhaus Zürich. 

He was already familiar with film acting in 1989, having played a part in short film Karl and afterwards e.g. in the Eurocops series (1991) with Barbara Rudnik (Director: Markus Imboden). Since the summer of 2003 he joint the cast of Swiss sitcom Lüthi und Blanc. Ever since then Wiesnekker was able to select his roles himself, even abroad (He speaks German, Swiss German, Dutch, English and French). He likes to learn his lines in crowded pubs.
He chooses his roles intuitively, not necessarily big ones. The characters should be complex, the script interesting and the director gifted.

Cinema films (selection)
 The Silence (Director: Baran bo Odar), 2010
 Marmorera (Director: Markus Fischer), 2007
 Messy Christmas (Director:Vanessa Jopp), 2007
Breakout (Director: Mike Eschmann), 2006
Strähl (Director: Manuel Flurin Hendry), 2004
Eden (Director: Michael Hofmann), 2004
Bad News (short film) (Director: Christian Roesch), 2004
666 - Trau keinem mit dem Du schläfst (Director: Rainer Matsutani), 2002
Stille Liebe (Director: Christoph Schaub), 2001
Komiker (Director: Markus Imboden), 2000
Katzendiebe (Director: Markus Imboden), 1996
Der Nebelläufer (Director: Jörg Helbling), 1995
Always & Forever (1991)

TV films (selection) 
, 2009
Tarragona (Director: Peter Keglevic), 2006
Nebenwirkungen (Director: Manuel Siebenmann), 2006
Dr. Psycho – Die Bösen, die Bullen, meine Frau und ich (Director: Ralf Huettner), 2006
Der falsche Tod (Director: Martin Eigler), 2006
 (Director: Peter Keglevic, Hans Günter Bücking), 2005
Tatort – Schneetreiben (Director: Tobias Ineichen), 2005
 (Director: Jo Baier), 2003
Königskinder (Director: Isabel Kleefeld), 2002
Füür oder Flamme (Director: Markus Fischer), 2002
Dilemma (Director: Tobias Ineichen), 2002
Hat er Arbeit? (Director: Kai Wessel), 2000
Wolfsheim (Director: Nicole Weegmann), 2000
Erhöhte Waldbrandgefahr (Director: Matthias Zschokke), 1996

Theater play (selection) 
Clockwork Orange (Director: Michel Schröder), Fabriktheater Zürich, 2004
Nur noch heute (Director: Barbara David Brüesch), Theater Gessnerallee Zürich and Sophiensäle Berlin, 2004
Heinrich IV (Director: Stefan Pucher), Schauspielhaus Zürich, 2002

External links 
 www.wiesnekker.com
 Page of film Strähl

References 

1967 births
Living people
People from Uster
Swiss male stage actors
Swiss male film actors
Swiss male television actors